Suchart Jairsuraparp (or Chairsuvaparb, Thai: สุชาติ แจสุรภาพ, born 13 June 1951) is a Thai former sprinter. He competed at the 1976 Summer Olympics in the 100 m and 4 × 100 m events, but failed to reach the finals. Jairsuraparp won the 100 m event at the Asian Championships in 1979, 1981 and 1983, placing second in 1973. At the Asian Games he won three gold, one silver and two bronze medals between 1974 and 1982.

International competitions

1Representing Asia

References

1951 births
Living people
Suchart Jairsuraparp
Suchart Jairsuraparp
Athletes (track and field) at the 1976 Summer Olympics
Asian Games medalists in athletics (track and field)
Athletes (track and field) at the 1974 Asian Games
Athletes (track and field) at the 1978 Asian Games
Athletes (track and field) at the 1982 Asian Games
Suchart Jairsuraparp
Suchart Jairsuraparp
Suchart Jairsuraparp
Medalists at the 1974 Asian Games
Medalists at the 1978 Asian Games
Medalists at the 1982 Asian Games
Suchart Jairsuraparp
Suchart Jairsuraparp
Southeast Asian Games medalists in athletics
Suchart Jairsuraparp
Suchart Jairsuraparp